Augustin Nicolas Gilbert (15 February 1858 – 4 March 1927) was a French physician. He was born in the town of Buzancy, Ardennes, and died in Paris. 

He received his doctorate from the University of Paris and became an interne at the Hôtel-Dieu de Paris. Later he was a professor of therapeutics (1902) and clinical medicine (1905) at Hôtel-Dieu. In 1907 he became a member of the Académie de Médecine.

He published many articles and books on a wide array of medical subjects. With Jean Alfred Fournier (1832-1914) he published Bibliothèque rouge de l'étudiant en médecine, and with Paul Brouardel (1837-1906) and others, he published the multi-volume Traité de médecine et de Thérapeutique. With neurologist Maurice Villaret (1877–1946), he conducted extensive research of portal hypertension.

Gilbert described a hereditary cause of increased bilirubin; today this disorder is known as Gilbert's syndrome and is believed to be caused by a deficiency of the enzyme glucuronosyltransferase.

Works
 Formulaire : [ancien Formulaire de Dujardin-Beaumetz] . Doin, Paris 23e Ed. 1911 Digital edition by the University and State Library Düsseldorf

References

20th-century French physicians
1858 births
1927 deaths
People from Ardennes (department)
19th-century French physicians